The Time War, more specifically called the Last Great Time War, is a conflict within the fictional universe of the British science fiction television series Doctor Who. The war occurs between the events of the 1996 film and the 2005 revived series, with the Time Lords fighting the Daleks until the apparent mutual destruction of both races. The war was frequently mentioned when the show returned, but was not directly seen until the show's 50th anniversary special. 

Over the course of several episodes, the conflict is only implied by short clues and comments, particularly the discussion in the 2007 episode "The Sound of Drums", and part two of the 2010 episode "The End of Time". The Time War is finally depicted in the 50th anniversary special "The Day of the Doctor", featuring the climax of the final battle and the Time Lords' fate.

The Last Great Time War

Origins
The Last Great Time War pitted the Time Lords of Gallifrey against the Daleks of Skaro. The specific incident that sparked the conflict remains unclear, but according to executive producer Russell T Davies, the origins dated back to conflicts between the Doctor and the Daleks. In Genesis of the Daleks (1975), the Time Lords—having foreseen the possibility of the Daleks conquering the universe—send the Fourth Doctor into the past in an attempt to avert the Daleks' creation, affect their development to make them less aggressive, or discover an inherent weakness they could exploit.

In retaliation for this ultimately unsuccessful mission, the Daleks attempt to infiltrate the High Council of the Time Lords with duplicates of the Fifth Doctor in Resurrection of the Daleks (1984), followed by an open declaration of hostilities by one of the Dalek Emperors in Remembrance of the Daleks (1988).

Two specific events led up to the outbreak of the war: a peace treaty was attempted by President Romana under the "Act of Master Restitution". This attempt was followed by the "Etra Prime Incident" (The Apocalypse Element), which some say "began the escalation of events". Weapons used by the Time Lords included Bowships, Black Hole Carriers and N-Forms (the last from Davies' 1996 New Adventures novel Damaged Goods), while the Daleks wielded "the full might of the Deathsmiths of Goth" (from the comic strip story Black Legacy by Alan Moore and David Lloyd) and launched a massive fleet led by the Emperor into the vortex.

Progression
The 'duration' and extent of the War has been unclear. The statement made by Jack Harkness in "The Parting of the Ways" – confirmed by the Doctor – that the Daleks "vanished out of time and space" to fight the War, would indicate that it was not waged in normal space-time. Nonetheless, there was fighting on the planet Gallifrey. At some point, however, the conflict engulfed a sufficient bulk of the cosmos for Cass, a character from "The Night of the Doctor", to declare that the Daleks and Time Lords had not yet succeeded in their efforts to destroy it - some of it was "still standing". Several races hostile to the Time Lords, e.g. the Sontarans, wished to participate but were forbidden to do so.

The Doctor claims to have fought on the front lines and was present at the Fall of Arcadia. Arcadia was Gallifrey's second city fortified with four hundred "sky trenches". These were thought to be impregnable until an invading Dalek squadron swept them away (as seen in the 2013 mini-episode "The Last Day").

The 2013 mini-episode "The Night of the Doctor" reveals that the Eighth Doctor at first was a conscientious objector, instead working to help where he could. This led him to attempt to save a woman from a spaceship crashing towards the planet Karn, who refused his aid because he was a Time Lord, apparently believing that the Time Lords had become just as destructive as the Daleks. The Doctor was killed in the crash, but was restored to life temporarily by the Sisterhood of Karn, who finally convinced him that for the sake of the universe, he had to take a stand and fight. They further offered an elixir that would control his regeneration and allow him to take a form best suited for the task. The Doctor accepted, remarking that there was no need for a Doctor in a universe consumed by war, and regenerated into the War Doctor.

Davros, the creator of the Daleks, also fought during the war after his creations (which had turned against him during Genesis of the Daleks but caused his revival in Destiny of the Daleks) rehabilitated him to a leadership position. In the first year of the War, Davros' command ship was seemingly destroyed at the Gates of Elysium after flying into the jaws of the Nightmare Child. Unbeknownst to the Doctor, who had tried to save him, Davros was rescued by Dalek Caan, who had escaped the events of "Evolution of the Daleks" (2007) via an emergency temporal shift.

The war resulted in countless millions dying endless deaths, as time travel was used by both sides to reverse battles that caused massive fatalities on both sides. These excesses of temporal warfare eventually led to the whole of the conflict becoming "time-locked", so that no time traveller could go back into it. The Doctor described the final days of the war as "hell", featuring "the Skaro Degradations, the Horde of Travesties, the Nightmare Child, the Could-Have-Been King with his army of Meanwhiles and Never-Weres".

As the war progressed, the Time Lords became increasingly aggressive and unscrupulous. Growing in desperation, they accessed a cache of forbidden doomsday weapons fashioned by the ancients of Gallifrey known as the Omega Arsenal. All were wielded against the Dalek menace save one: "the Moment". Moreover, they resurrected the Master, a renegade Time Lord and nemesis to the Doctor, as they believed him to be the "perfect warrior for a time war". However, after the Dalek Emperor gained control of the Cruciform, the Master deserted his post, used the chameleon arch to disguise himself as a human and escaped to a time period shortly before the end of the universe. Genetically a human, he escaped the destruction of all Time Lords as well as detection by the Doctor – who was unaware of his resurrection in the first place. The Master also remained ignorant of the latter phase and outcome of the war until he emerged from hiding, when he was told by the Doctor many years later.

Leadership among the Time Lords remained vague during the earlier phase of the war. Ultimately, Rassilon, founder of the Time Lord society and its time travel technology who had discovered the secret of immortality, returned to assume leadership as Lord President, a position he was first to hold.  Refusing the possibility of his civilisation being destroyed by the Daleks, Rassilon prepared a doomsday scenario, the so-called "Ultimate Sanction". This genocidal scheme included sacrificing all of time itself, thereby destroying the Daleks and all life in the universe. The Time Lords themselves would have transcended into a non-corporeal collective consciousness that would be the only sentient form of life in existence. The Time Lords, apparently hardened by the horrors of war, gave near-unanimous support for this plan – only two Time Lords dissented when the issue was put to a full vote. Prior to the vote, when one of the Council, the Partisan, suggested shelving the Ultimate Sanction and that it may be better if Gallifrey were destroyed, Rassilon disintegrated her.

While the High Council continued to lead Time Lord society during the war, a separate War Council was tasked with overseeing the war itself, as well as Gallifrey's defences.  The War Council was led by an unknown Time Lord general. During the last days of the Time War, the War Council apparently became disillusioned with the High Council.

Conclusion
On the last day of the Time War, the Dalek fleets surrounding Gallifrey launched what was said to be their biggest attack ever on the planet. The ten million Dalek ships subjected Gallifrey to a massive orbital bombardment and deployed numerous Daleks to invade the surface. Dalek forces captured the city of Arcadia, then laid siege to the capital itself. However, they were unable to break through the capital's sky trenches. Upon learning of Rassilon's "Ultimate Sanction", the War Doctor stole an ancient Gallifreyan weapon known as the Moment, or the Galaxy Eater, and intended to reduce Gallifrey into "rocks and dust" with the inferno wiping out the Dalek fleet. By this point, the entire period of war had become "time locked", so that no time traveller could enter or exit it.

Fearing that the Doctor would use the Moment, Rassilon and his fellow councillors attempted to escape the Lock by retroactively planting a four-note drumbeat (the rhythm of a Time Lord's heartbeats) into the Master's brain as a child and cause his descent into madness. From there, once the signal is made tangible enough, a Whitepoint Star, a diamond only found on Gallifrey, is used to create a link between the final day of the Time War and Earth so the Master could release Gallifrey from the Time Lock. The plan ultimately failed, as the Doctor destroyed the diamond link and the Master apparently sacrificed his life to take revenge on Rassilon, sending the Time Lords back to their apparent doom. Unknown to almost everyone involved however, this was not the final end of the Time Lords. As "the Moment" had a will of its own, it showed the War Doctor an alternative solution and ultimately enabled thirteen incarnations of the Doctor, ranging from the First Doctor through the Twelfth Doctor, to gather to save Gallifrey by freezing it in time and removing it from the universe. The sudden disappearance of Gallifrey left the Daleks firing upon and subsequently annihilating themselves, while the Time Lords remained; albeit powerless and forgotten.

As the War Doctor regenerated into the Ninth Doctor, his memory of him and his other incarnations saving Gallifrey was wiped as a means for his timeline to correct itself, leaving the Doctor with the belief he had in fact used the Moment to destroy Gallifrey, the Time Lords, and the Daleks. The Doctor was haunted with the false knowledge of his home planet's demise, with even some of his enemies like the Beast using that guilt against him. The Doctor's later incarnations even displayed a self-loathing towards their War Doctor incarnation before the Eleventh Doctor and Tenth Doctor learned the truth and accepted him as a legitimate Doctor incarnation. Though the destruction of both races marked the end of the war, the Ninth Doctor learns of the Dalek Emperor's survival with Rose wiping out both him and his fleet in "The Parting of the Ways" as Bad Wolf while proclaiming the final end of the War. This is affirmed by the Tenth Doctor, who describes to Jack Harkness in "Utopia" that his resurrection by Rose was part of the final act of the War.

Consequences

Removal of the Time Lords
Following what was for all intents and purposes the removal of the Time Lords, the Doctor believed himself to be the last of his race. The removal of the Time Lords also had a profound impact on time travel. In the 2006 episode "Rise of the Cybermen" when the Tenth Doctor, Rose Tyler and Mickey Smith are trapped in an alternative reality, the Doctor explains that, when the Time Lords were around, travel between parallel universes was less difficult but, with their demise, the paths between worlds are now closed. The Time Lords could also prevent or repair paradoxes such as the one created by Rose in an attempt to save her father's life in a traffic accident. After the Time Lords' disappearance, such a paradox summons the Reapers, who descended to "sterilise the wound" in time by devouring everything in sight, and are only stopped by Pete Tyler killing himself.

Because of the Time Lock, along with the danger of creating a paradox, the Doctor is prevented from going back in time and saving the Time Lords. The Tenth Doctor warns another character against trying to alter his own timeline as such meddling would "destroy two-thirds of the universe" and resists an offer by Krillitane Mr Finch, using the Skasis Paradigm, which would have given the Doctor the ability to reorder the universe and allowed him to stop the war. The Doctor would only change his decision and assure his race's survival after contributing to it as the Eleventh Doctor during the events of "The Day of the Doctor".

Throughout series 5, the Eleventh Doctor encounters cracks in "the skin of the universe". The Doctor learns that the cracks, which erase those they consume from history, are a result of the Silence causing the Doctor's TARDIS to explode on 26 June 2010. During the events of "The Big Bang", the Doctor manages to close all the cracks using the TARDIS explosion and the Pandorica to produce a second Big Bang that restores the universe. During the events of "The Time of the Doctor", the Doctor discovers one remaining crack on the planet Trenzalore, through which the Time Lords transmit a "truth field" that ensures that all inhabitants speak the truth, along with the First Question: "Doctor Who?". The intention is for the Doctor to give his true name, which will verify to the Time Lords it is safe for them to return to the universe. Fleets of various races, some being former War participants, gathered in Trenzalore's orbit to either prevent the Doctor from speaking his name, or resume the War if the Time Lords return. The Church of the Papal Mainframe undergoes a faith change into the Church of the Silence as a dedication to keeping the peace, with a rogue chapter led by Madame Kovarian unknowingly causing the events in series 5 and 6 and leading to the Doctor's arrival on Trenzalore. In the end, the Time Lords remain in exile and close the remaining crack, but not before heeding Clara's plea for them to save the Doctor, old and weary from his years protecting Trenzalore, granting him a new cycle of regenerations, which allow him to destroy the Dalek fleet surrounding the planet.

Remnants of the Daleks
Despite the Doctor's efforts, not all Daleks perished in the war. The Ninth Doctor encounters a single, dysfunctional Dalek in a museum on Earth in 2012, which had apparently been on Earth for 50 years. It eventually commits suicide after gaining human feelings via Rose Tyler touching it. The Doctor later discovers that the Dalek Emperor itself had also survived, and had gone on to build a whole new Dalek race, using the organic material of human cadavers by completely rewriting their DNA. The destruction of the Emperor and its fleet in the year 200,100 during an attack on Earth at the conclusion of the 2005 series by a time vortex-augmented Rose Tyler is accompanied by her declaration that "the Time War ends".

The elite Cult of Skaro also survived by fleeing into the Void between dimensions in a specialised ship, taking with them the Genesis Ark, a Time Lord prison ship containing millions of Daleks. The new Dalek army released from the Ark on Earth in the 21st century – after the Ark is touched by a time-traveler, Mickey Smith – is sucked back into the Void due to the actions of the Tenth Doctor, but the specially-equipped cult members use an "emergency temporal shift" to escape that fate. They reappear in 1930 in New York where they try to use humans to create a new race of Daleks. While three members of the Cult of Skaro are killed, the fourth – Dalek Caan – escapes through another emergency temporal shift. Dalek Caan returns to the Time War and, at the cost of its sanity, rescues the Daleks' creator, Davros. Davros subsequently uses cells from his own body to create a new Dalek Empire and keeps Caan close at his side because of the latter's prophetic abilities. The Daleks attempt to destroy all reality with a 'Reality Bomb' powered by 27 stolen Worlds, leaving themselves the only creatures. However, Caan manipulated Davros to help the Doctor and Donna Noble defeat the Daleks after seeing the damage the Daleks had caused throughout time. The Daleks are destroyed by a clone of the Tenth Doctor, while Davros and Caan are left behind on the Dalek flagship as it is destroyed.

One ship containing three Daleks escaped that defeat after accidentally falling through time, where it then picked up a trace of a Progenitor device that contained pure Dalek DNA. However, because these Daleks had been created from the DNA of Davros, the Progenitor did not accept them as true "Daleks"; to restart the Progenitor, the Daleks trick the Eleventh Doctor into activating it for them during World War II by declaring them Daleks (which the device accepts). Once activated, the Progenitor device created a new "Paradigm" of Daleks that destroyed the previous Daleks and escaped through time, forming a new race of Daleks. Eventually learning of the Time Lords' survival alongside various other races during the events of "The Time of the Doctor", the Daleks laid siege on the planet Trenzalore for centuries to either resume the Time War or kill the Doctor before he could release the Time Lords back into the universe. In the end, the Dalek fleet was wiped out by the Eleventh Doctor during the first phase of his regeneration.

Survival of the Master
After the Time War, the Doctor is convinced that he is the only surviving Time Lord, saying that he would know of any others if they had survived. The last words of the Face of Boe were "You Are Not Alone". The cryptic statement is explained when the Doctor encounters a man named Professor Yana who is revealed to be the Master. The Master had been hiding in human form at the end of the universe using a Chameleon Arch, having escaped the destruction of both the Time Lords and the Daleks. By taking human form, he avoided detection by the Doctor, who was apparently unaware of his nemesis' resurrection during the Time War. (Later spin-off stories reveal that the Doctor and the Master had fought together during the War for a time, but the Doctor was simply unaware that the Master had escaped death in the War itself.)

Impact on other species
The timelines of other races and planets shifted without the inhabitants of the worlds affected being aware of the changes in history, as they were a part of them. Most affected were the Greater Animus, which died; the Zygons, who lost their home planet, Zygor, and attempted to conquer Earth for its resources; the Eternals, who apparently fled this reality in despair; and the Gelth, who lost their physical form and were reduced to gaseous beings, who attempted to possess human corpses in 1869 using a Time Rift in Cardiff. The Gelth described the war's impact as "invisible to lower species but devastating to higher forms", such as the Forest of Cheem, which was distraught at the bloodshed. It is also said to have destroyed the unnamed race that Eve originated from.

The Time War and continuity

The Time War provides a convenient in-story explanation for any contradictions in series continuity: for example, writer Paul Cornell has suggested that Earth's destruction by an expanding sun in "The End of the World" five billion years hence, as opposed to the original depiction of its demise around the year 10,000,000 AD in The Ark (1966), can be attributed to changes in history due to the War. Steven Moffat, writer and later executive producer for Doctor Who, has gone further, arguing that "a television series which embraces both the ideas of parallel universes and the concept of changing time can't have a continuity error—it's impossible for Doctor Who to get it wrong, because we can just say 'he changed time—it's a time ripple from the Time War.

Time Wars in spin-off media

The Last Great Time War and previous time wars also feature in various Doctor Who spin-off media.

Eighth Doctor Adventures (The War in Heaven)
In a story arc stretching through several of the Eighth Doctor Adventures novels (written before the new series began in 2005), the Doctor learns that, at some point in his personal future, a war will be fought between the Time Lords and an unnamed Enemy. The Eighth Doctor first becomes involved in the events of the war during the events of Alien Bodies, when he unintentionally learns of the War while attending an auction that is attended by various parties in the war- including a future Time Lord, a representative of the Enemy, Faction Paradox, the UNIT of the 2050s, and agents of the rogue Time Lords known as the Celestis-, not only learning about the War ahead of schedule, but also learning that the auction is for the body of his future self, due to his biodata codes being the only means of accessing dangerous Time Lord secrets after he died in the early days of the War. In the later novel The Taking of Planet 5, the Doctor must stop a group of future Time Lords from releasing the monstrous Fendahl in an attempt to use it as a weapon, which results in the destruction of the Celestis pocket dimension. Later in this story arc, Gallifrey is also destroyed as a result of the Eighth Doctor attempting to prevent the war from beginning as the Enemy begin their first assault in The Ancestor Cell, having learned that he unintentionally provoked the War after his history was changed by Faction Paradox, the Doctor believing that it would be better for the Time Lords to die now rather than experience a war that would dehumanise them to the point of becoming monsters which all evidence suggests they could not win. This cataclysm also creates an event horizon in time that prevents anyone from entering Gallifrey's relative past or travelling from it to the present or future. In the aftermath of this conflict Gallifrey was essentially erased from history, and the universe thrown in to chaos, allowing other species to try and take control of history, while also giving things like magic to exist in the universe, as in the main timeline the Time Lords had removed and erased such things form the universe near its beginning. The last Eighth Doctor Adventures novel, The Gallifrey Chronicles, establishes that the Doctor has the ability to restore the planet and its inhabitants, having downloaded the contents of the Matrix into his subconscious mind in the minutes before Gallifrey's destruction, albeit at the cost of his own memories. The novel ends without revealing if he does indeed succeed in restoring Gallifrey.  However a vision the Doctor received of the future in a book not long before showed that Gallifrey would be restored to existence in the future.

Russell T Davies, executive producer of the series, commented that there is no connection between the War of the books and the Time War of the television series, comparing Gallifrey being destroyed twice with Earth's two World Wars. He also said that he was "usually happy for old and new fans to invent the Complete History of the Doctor in their heads, completely free of the production team's hot and heavy hands".

The future of the Time War which was erased by the Eighth Doctor in the Eighth Doctor Adventures' War, referred to as the "War in Heaven", also appears in the Faction Paradox novels conceived by Lawrence Miles (as well as some of the aftermath of its later erasure from history) .

Doctor Who comic strip
In three comic strip stories written by Alan Moore in 1980 and 1981, the Time Lords, assisted by the Special Executive, fight a time war early in their history against the "Order of the Black Sun", based some thirty thousand years in their future. The first strike of the war, from the Time Lords' point of view, is when a Black Sun agent travels back in time, and attacks the Time Lords just as they are about to turn the star Qqaba into a power source for their time experiments. This also causes the apparent demise of the stellar engineer Omega. The Time Lords do not know why the Black Sun (whom they had never encountered before the attack) should have wanted to strike at them, and surmise that it was for something they had yet to do. Years later, at a diplomatic conference, a representative of the Order is murdered by the Sontarans, and the murder is blamed on the Time Lords. This provides the motivation for the war's beginnings, as from the Order's point of view, the Time Lords are the ones who strike first.

Gallifrey audio series
Gallifrey is the umbrella title of a series of audio plays by Big Finish Productions, set on Gallifrey during Romana's tenure as President. In Gallifrey: Panacea, the final chapter of the third series, the Time Lord Irving Braxiatel speaks of "rumours out there in the big wide universe—more than rumours, in fact—that something's coming to Gallifrey, something worse than you could possibly imagine." Because of these rumours, Braxiatel engineers the removal of the Time Lord biodata archive from Gallifrey, in order that the Time Lords might someday be restored after their planet meets its doom. Former Big Finish producer Gary Russell indicated in a forum posting on Outpost Gallifrey that this was a reference to the television series' Time War.

The sixth series of Gallifrey features the Daleks invading Gallifrey, but this invasion was undone thanks to Romana, Leela, K9 and Narvin, aided by Romana's future self. The ninth series more directly featured the Time War with Romana and Leela playing key roles, including Leela being sent on a mission with the Derek Jacobi Master, Irving Braxiatel taking Ace on a mission to test her ability to fight in the War, and the resurrection of Rassilon through a complex Time Lord project that allowed Rassilon's consciousness to take over the body of another Time Lord.

The later Companion Chronicles audio story, The Catalyst, implies that Leela survived the Time War; she mentions that her adopted homeworld no longer exists and she ages rapidly due to the Time Lords no longer being able to keep her young.

Dark Eyes
The Dark Eyes audio series is also in effect a lead up to the Last Great Time War from the Doctor's perspective, the first series being a complex plan by the Daleks to erase the Time Lords from existence. Dark Eyes 2 also sees the resurrection of the Master in preparation for the war.

Doom Coalition
The Doom Coalition series begins when the Eighth Doctor and his companion Liv Chenka are assigned to recapture the Eleven, a Time Lord criminal who suffers from a unique form of mental illness where all of his past incarnations are active in his head at once, the two swiftly acquiring a new companion in the form of Helen Sinclair. In the course of their travels, the Doctor, Liv and Helen learn that their hunt for the Eleven is being manipulated by the Doctor's former friend Padrac, who has become convinced that Gallifrey is destined to be destroyed in every future, and has thus masterminded a complex plan to destroy the rest of the universe to ensure Gallifrey's survival, with the Eleven's actions drawing the Doctor into positions where he will discover the equipment needed for Padrac's scheme to succeed. Although Padrac gathers his equipment and prepares to unleash a powerful psychic blast that will destroy the universe, the Doctor is eventually able to thwart this plan by disrupting Padrac's equipment at the last minute, informing his former friend that he will bear the burden of Gallifrey's future destruction if that prophecy is correct but refuses to believe that it is acceptable to destroy the rest of the universe to save one planet.

Ravenous
The Ravenous series depicts the aftermath of Doom Coalition as the Eighth Doctor and Liv search for the lost Helen and resume their travels while learning of the return of the Ravenous, a race of beings who essentially 'eat' regeneration energy. In the audio Deeptime Frontier the Doctor, Liv and Helen discover a Time Lord experiment to acquire new sources of power if the Eye of Harmony should be lost, foreshadowing how the Doctor's TARDIS will develop such independence after Gallifrey's destruction. The series finale, Day of the Master, features the War Master (Derek Jacobi) assisting his past and future selves in acquiring the Matrix print of Artron, an ancient Time Lord scientist who found means of extending a Time Lord's regeneration cycle, with the Masters using this to restore their own ability to regenerate, setting up the existence of the Master witnessed in Dark Eyes; the War Master all-but-explicitly states that he has made a deal with the Time Lords to save himself with this knowledge, albeit only to give himself a new cycle of standard regenerations.

Doctor Who Adventures
In this comic book series an insectoid race called the Skrawn appeared, whose planet Kolox the Doctor claims was destroyed in the Time War.

Doctor Who Magazine
The Doctor Who Magazine comic storyline The Clockwise Man, which was set during the Twelfth Doctor's era, included a flashback to the Time War and early in the life of the War Doctor, depicting the events that led to the apparent death of the Doctor's old friend Fey Truscott-Sade and the War Doctor's decision to renounce his name.

The Forgotten
In the IDW comic miniseries The Forgotten, the Tenth Doctor recounts to Martha Jones a story from the Eighth Doctor's participation in the Time War. The Eighth Doctor was imprisoned by a race of robots for several weeks on a planet in the middle of the war, before teaming up with a Malmooth fellow prisoner and faking his death to escape. It is revealed his capture was staged by him so that he could acquire the Great Key he needed to arm a modified De-Mat Gun that could be used to seal the Medusa Cascade. The Tenth Doctor further implies that the Eighth Doctor died, alone and companionless, at the end of the Time War. This conflicts with "The Night of the Doctor" and "The Day of the Doctor"'s depiction of the Time War, where it's established that the Eighth Doctor died and regenerated into the War Doctor before becoming the Ninth Doctor, and the Eighth Doctor refused to fight in the War until shortly before his regeneration into the War Doctor.

The Sarah Jane Adventures
In The Mad Woman in the Attic, a two-part serial of the Doctor Who spinoff series The Sarah Jane Adventures, Eve speaks about the Time War, stating that her people could see timelines; this made them a target, and they were exterminated.

Engines of War
In July 2014, the BBC released the novel Engines of War by George Mann, which features the War Doctor in a novel set in the Time War itself. During the novel, the War Doctor and his new companion Cinder—a human resistance fighter on the Dalek-occupied world of Moldox—discover that the Daleks intend to use the temporal anomalies of the Tantalus Eye, a rift in time in the Moldox system, to develop a weapon that could completely erase Gallifrey and the Time Lords from history, with Rassilon's plan to stop the Dalek plot involving the destruction of the Eye and all inhabited planets around it. Refusing to accept this, the Doctor is able to sabotage Rassilon's plan and use the energy of the Tantalus Eye to erase the Daleks' scheme, but the actions of a Time Lord agent result in Cinder's death, leaving the War Doctor resolved to end the war once and for all as he recognises how far his people have fallen in the name of victory.

The War Doctor audio series
The War Doctor series was produced by Big Finish Productions following John Hurt's role as the War Doctor in “The Day of the Doctor”. Hurt reprised his role alongside Jacqueline Pearce as Cardinal Ollistra, who frequently sends the War Doctor on missions to give the Time Lords the upper hand over the Daleks. Following Hurt's death, the series ended after four volumes in February 2017.
A follow-up series was subsequently launched featuring the Eighth Doctor and set during the early years of the Time War.

The Eighth Doctor: The Time War audio series
With the announcement of The War Doctor, Big Finish Productions also announced a prequel box set featuring the Eighth Doctor during the early days of the conflict. This was later expanded into a four-volume series set prior to his regeneration in "The Night of the Doctor" but after Ravenous, the sequel to Doom Coalition. Paul McGann will reprise his role with Rakhee Thakrar playing Bliss, his new companion. The third volume also features the return of the Valeyard, who is recruited by the Time Lords attempt to be a soldier in the War after he is 'recreated' through an accident when the Doctor uses a transmat while carrying a device that can manipulate biology.

Eighth Doctor in the Time War in spin-off series
As well as the Time War series itself, the Eighth Doctor has also been depicted taking a role in the Time War in various audios that are part of other series. The Classic Doctors, New Monsters audios; "The Sontaran Ordeal" sees him caught up in a Sontaran invasion of a planet that has just been 'contaminated' by the Time War so that its once-peaceful history now features centuries of conflict, and "Day of the Vashta Nerada" has the Doctor discover an experiment to artificially alter the Vashta Nerada to be used as weapons in the War. The Short Trip audios "A Heart on Both Sides" by Rob Nisbet and "All Hands on Deck" by Eddie Robson also explore the Doctor's role in the War; "Heart on Both Sides" sees the Eighth Doctor working as the assistant to his former companion Nyssa, operating under an alias, to protect her from a rumour he heard in the future about the destruction of a ship matching the description of Nyssa's hospital ship, and "All Hands on Deck" sees Susan, the Doctor's granddaughter, joining the Time War and leaving her life on Earth despite the Doctor's pleas for her to join his role as conscientious objector. In The Diary of River Song: Series One- The Rulers of the Universe, the Doctor learns that an ancient race of world-builders have been drawn into the future by the Time War and are destroying planets whose civilisations do not meet their standards, working with his future wife River Song (who communicates with him over a distorted radio to prevent him recognizing her) to disable their planned bomb at galactic centre. In The Legacy of Time audio "Lies in Ruins" the Doctor encounters River and his predecessor's companion Benny Summerfield while he is travelling with a woman called Ria, as the two archaeologists discover what appears to be a fragment of Gallifrey, but it is soon revealed that the 'fragment' of Gallifrey is actually part of a prototype TARDIS while Ria is an android the Doctor created to tell him that he was right as he tried to escape the War, with the events of the audio forcing him to acknowledge that he can't ignore the conflict even if he still refuses to fight in it.

The War Master audio series
The War Master series was announced in June 2017 for release in December. The release features Derek Jacobi reprising his role as The Master from the 2007 episode "Utopia" and follows the character during the Time War. In the course of these audios, the Master is shown seeking new sources of power for himself, but after he proves unable to control the power of the Heavenly Paradigm, which causes both sides in the Time War to win conflicts they previously lost, the series ends with the Master fleeing in fear to the distant future, setting up his future existence as 'Professor Yana'.

Doctor Who and the Time War
Penned by Russell T. Davies for the Doctor Who Magazine before the 50th Anniversary, the short story set before 'Rose' depicts a different account of the Time War's outcome, with the Eighth Doctor using the Moment to destroy the Time Lords and Daleks alike and end the Last Great Time War once and for all. Before collapsing into his TARDIS and regenerating into the Ninth Doctor.

Future 
Doctor Who Magazine revealed that Big Finish will produce another Time War range.

References

Other notes

External links
 

Doctor Who concepts
Fictional wars
Temporal war fiction
Genocide in fiction